"Ra-Ta-Ta" or "Ra-Ta-Ta-Ta" may refer to:

Ra-Ta-Ta (Chris Juwens song),Numerous artists in Europe have reworked a German song as "Ra Ta-Ta-Ta."
Ra-Ta Ta-Ta (Anna Abreu song) 2014
"Ra-Ta-Ta", written Lake Steppin' with the World Saxophone Quartet

See also
"Ta-Ra-Ta-Ta", Mina (Italian singer)	1966
Ta-Ra-Ra-Boom-Ti-Aye,